Aruvam is a 2019 Indian Tamil-language supernatural horror thriller film written and directed by Sai Sekhar. The film stars Siddharth and Catherine Tresa with Kabir Duhan Singh, Madhusudhan Rao, Sathish, Aadukalam Naren and Manobala in supportive roles. Sai Thaman composed the film's soundtrack while cinematography and editing were handled by N. K. Ekambaram and Praveen K. L. respectively. Principal photography commenced on 13 July 2018.

Plot
A few months ago, Jyothi is working as a schoolteacher at a primary school. She does not have a sense of smell and remains inferior about it. One day, Jagannathan sees Jyothi free a parakeet being used for parrot astrology and falls in love with her. He follows her. Jagan confesses his love to her, but she ignores him. So he visits her father at her home and talks to her. She doesn't want to be a burden to her future husband because of her anosmia. Also, she reveals that at a young age, she lost her mother to a gas explosion because she could not smell the leaking gas. A few days later, Jyothi visits the temple to pray that Jagan and her father should have a change of heart about her wedding. At that moment, her sari catches fire from the diyas. She fails to smell the fire or hear the shouts from nearby women because of the loud noises. Luckily, Jagan pours milk over her to dampen the fire. He advises that you need someone to protect her and leaves the temple.

A watchman at Jyothi's school gets beaten by an apparition near a massive banyan tree. The headmaster gets angry after seeing destroyed food. Jyothi feels sorry for the poor students after hearing their stories. The school headmaster requests that she prepares the question papers for exams. She opens the window blinds while she is working, and a sudden gust blows in, and all the question papers fly in the air. Jyothi desperately tries to catch them, but she falls down the stairs and gets admitted to the hospital.

While she is in the hospital, she smells something. She then walks around the hospital and smells an electrical fire in an old man's room. Jyothi and her father are ecstatic that she has got her sense of smell back. She enjoys her life now. One night, Mahadevan gets brutally strangled and impaled by an unknown force. The health minister, Mr Sanyasa Murthy, sees Mahadevan's petrified eyes and says someone murdered him. The next day, the health minister gets murdered after being strangled by his rudraksha. Jyothi dreams of going on a date with Jagan. Vikram, Sanyasa Murthy's younger brother, Dinesh, and Daniel investigate the murders of the health minister and Mahadevan. Vikram spots a hair that belongs to a lady. After calling information artists to trace the hair's DNA, they manage to get the face of the lady. After searching the face on the Aadhar card database, it matches Jyothi. Jyothi gets beaten up by Daniel and his henchmen. When she is about to be assaulted, Jyothi gets possessed by a supernatural force. The force reveals itself to Daniel, which turns out to be Jagan's soul. The possessed Jyothi then murders Daniel by stabbing him with a crane hook. Jagan reveals himself to Jyothi and tells her his flashback of how he got killed.

Past: Jagan is a Food Inspector with a phenomenal sense of smell. He is a crusader against food adulteration happening in various food outlets in different parts of Tamil Nadu. He orders the closure of the outlets when he detects adulteration. His crusade against food adulteration induces many enemies in his path, including Vikram, Dinesh, and Daniel, as well as his own higher official in the Food Safety Department. His enemies attack him; Jagan fights them but gets mortally wounded and weakened, after which he decides to give up his life by falling off a train onto a banyan tree. Daniel burns his body. Jagan also reveals that he murdered the three rogues through Jyothi.

Present: Jyothi tells Jagan to leave him alone after she hears how he murdered those people. Jyothi reveals to her father that Jagan is dead. Meanwhile, ten students at her school died after eating adulterated eggs. She pleas against injustice but is ignored by others. Meanwhile, an exorcist traps Jagan's soul and tells Vikram and Dinesh to catch Jyothi and kill her to stop Jagan from taking revenge. Soon, Jyothi gets kidnapped by goons hired by Vikram and Dinesh. After getting beaten up, Jyothi realises the deadly impact of adulteration and tells her to kill those villains. Eventually, Jagan possesses Jyothi and murders Vikram, Dinesh, and their rogues.

Cast

 Siddharth as Jagannathan
 Catherine Tresa as Jyothi (voice dubbed by Savitha Reddy)
 Kabir Duhan Singh as Vikram Jeyaraj
 Madhusudhan Rao as Dinesh Menon
 Stunt Silva as Daniel Christopher 
 Poster Nandakumar as Mahadevan
 Sathish as Sorimuthu (Muthu)
 Aadukalam Naren as Jyothi's father
 Tamilselvi as Jyothi's mother
 Manobala as School Headmaster
 Mayilsamy as School Watchman
 Goli Soda Seetha as School Teacher
 Sujatha Sivakumar as School Cook
 Murali Krrish as School PT Master
 Elango Kumaravel as Jagan's friend
 Gayathri Raguram as DNA Professional
 Hema Rajkumar as News Reporter
 Supergood Subramani as Parrot Astrologer

Production
After the success of Aval, actor Siddharth signed this thriller in 2018 which is being directed by Sai Sekhar. The shoot of the film went on floors on 13 July 2018 in Chennai. The film is reported to feature nearly 40 minutes of computer graphics.

Marketing
The first look poster of the film was unveiled on 31 December 2018. The official teaser was unveiled by Muzik 247 on 8 June 2019.

Soundtrack

The soundtrack is composed by S. S. Thaman with lyrics by Vijaya Saagar. The film's music rights are acquired by Muzik247.

Reception
Behindwoods rated the film 2.25 out of 5 and stated, "Aruvam has an important social message, but could have engaged better with an interesting screenplay". Indiaglitz gave 2.75 out of 5 and stated, "Go for this film that tackles a raging social evil with a mildly amusing horror element as well". M. Suganth of The Times of India gave 2 out of 5 and wrote, "Predictable plot developments and underwhelming writing turn this revenge drama into a dull affair". Sify rated it 2 out of 5 and called it a "disappointing revenge drama". Navein Darshan of The New Indian Express gave 1.5 out of 5 and said, "Despite the film being well-intentioned, it is a haphazardly made mismash of genres".

References

External links
 

2010s Tamil-language films
2010s supernatural thriller films
2019 films
Films shot in Chennai
Films scored by Thaman S
Indian supernatural thriller films
2019 thriller films
Indian horror drama films
Indian horror thriller films